ReWire is a software protocol, jointly developed by Propellerhead and Steinberg, allowing remote control and data transfer among digital audio editing and related software.  Originally appearing in the ReBirth software synthesizer in 1998, the protocol has since evolved into an industry standard.

Reason Studios has announced that they will discontinue the Rewire protocol at the end of 2020.

Currently used in macOS and Microsoft Windows 32-bit or 64-bit audio applications, ReWire enables the simultaneous transfer of up to 256 audio tracks of arbitrary resolution and 4080 channels of MIDI data. This allows, for example, the output from synthesizer software to be fed directly into a linear editor without the use of intermediate files or analog transfers.  There are also provisions to remotely trigger actions, such as starting and stopping recording. The protocol is licensed free of charge to companies only, but comes with a "non-disclosure of source code" license that is incompatible with most free-software licenses.

The ReWire system consists of "Hosts", "Panels", and "Devices". Hosts are the host applications which typically do the sequencing at one end and the final mixdown at the other end. A Device is a dynamic link library that only generates sound; it has no user interface. A Panel is a graphical interface for setting the parameters of one Device. A typical setup would be to use Ableton Live in "Host" mode, and use Propellerhead Reason as a synthesizer. In this case Reason would provide Device/Panel pairs to Ableton, which could then send MIDI commands, sync timing and mix Reason's output into its own effects chains. Many applications support either mode. In fact, an application could (at the discretion of a developer) act as both a Host and a Panel at the same time.

ReWire Hosts ("Sequencers/Trackers")
 Ableton Live
 Adobe Audition
 Cakewalk Sonar / Cakewalk by BandLab
 Cycling '74 Max/MSP
 FL Studio
 GarageBand
 Jeskola Buzz (with plugin.)
 Logic Pro
 MOTU Digital Performer
 MU.LAB
 Notion
 Plogue Bidule
Pro Tools
 REAPER
 Renoise
Samplitude
 Sonoma Wire Works RiffWorks
 Sony ACID Pro
 Steinberg Cubase
 Steinberg Nuendo
Studio One
Synapse Audio Orion Platinum
 Tracktion
 Zynewave Podium

ReWire Devices ("Synthesizers")
 Ableton Live
 Arturia Storm
 Cakewalk Project 5
 Cycling '74 Max/MSP
 Finale (beginning in v.25)
 FL Studio
 Plogue Bidule
 REAPER
 ReBirth RB-338
 Record
 Renoise
 Sibelius (beginning in v.6)
 Sony ACID Pro
 Vocaloid
 Vocaloid 2

See also 
JACK — a similar, open source API for Linux, macOS and Windows.

External links
Propellerheads' description of ReWire
A database of tutorials on how to rewire different combinations of rewire compatible software programs.
Reason Studios announcement of discontinuing the product

References

Music software plugin architectures